M D Ray (born July 20, 1972) is an Indian Surgical oncologist and author who designed 4 Onco surgical techniques adopted internationally.

Life and career 
Ray was born in West Bengal, India. He holds an MBBS from the Medical college, in Kolkata, West Bengal and a master's degree in surgery (MS) from the Army Hospital (R n R) Delhi University. He did Senior research fellowship under ICMR, New Delhi. He is a Fellow of the Royal College of Surgeons FRCS
from Glasgow, UK, and he is PhD in Clinico Molecular Oncology, AIIMS, New Delhi.

Ray served in the Indian Army for more than a decade. He participated in Operation Vijay in Kargil War of 1999. He served at the army hospital as a senior research fellow in Oncosurgery under the Indian council of medical research (ICMR). He also served in Army College of Medical Sciences, and Base Hospital, Delhi.

Ray is a cancer surgeon for the incurable metastatic cancer surgery and intra abdominal chemotherapy. He is a speaker in the field of cancer surgery. He is an active researcher in molecular oncology. He is also a teacher and examiner of cancer surgery super speciality students.

Ray is an active member of notable national and international cancer research projects. He is a fellow of International College of Surgeons (FICS) and Association of Surgeons of India (FAIS).

Ray has been running an NGO named Universal Unity Trust for prevention of cancer and child care. He has been featured in Limca Book of Records

Books
Ray has authored 26 and >100 scientific papers published in national and international journals. He is the author of Gateway to Success in Surgery. He published four international books on clinical surgery and surgical oncology, and 22 books on literature, mostly in Bengali Novels and short stories.

References

External links
 Universal Unity Trust website
 M D Ray on Google Scholar

Living people
Indian oncologists
Indian medical doctors
Indian surgeons
1972 births
Medical doctors from West Bengal